A company town is a place where practically all stores and housing are owned by the one company that is also the main employer. Company towns are often planned with a suite of amenities such as stores,  houses of worship, schools, markets and recreation facilities. They are usually bigger than a model village ("model" in the sense of an ideal to be emulated).

Some company towns have had high ideals, but many have been regarded as controlling and/or exploitative. Others developed more or less in unplanned fashion, such as Summit Hill, Pennsylvania, United States, one of the oldest, which began as a Lehigh Coal & Navigation Company mining camp and mine site nine miles (14.5 km) from the nearest outside road.

Overview
Traditional settings for company towns were where extractive industries – coal, metal mines, lumber – had established a monopoly franchise. Dam sites and war-industry camps founded other company towns. Since company stores often had a monopoly in company towns, it was often possible to pay in scrip through a truck system, although not all company towns engaged in this particular practice. In the Soviet Union there were several cities of nuclear scientists (atomics) known as atomgrad; particularly in Ukraine those were Pripyat, Varash, Yuzhnoukrainsk among others.

Typically, a company town is isolated from neighbors and centered on a large production factory, such as a lumber or steel mill or an automobile plant, and the citizens of the town either work in the factory, in one of the smaller businesses, or are a family member of someone who does. The company may also donate a church building to a local congregation, operate parks, host cultural events such as concerts, and so on.

A town that existed prior to the establishment of a primary business may not officially be a company town, but if the majority of citizens are employed by a single company, similar conditions may exist (especially in regard to the town's economy). Similar dependencies may exist in specific neighborhoods or areas within larger cities.

Company towns often become regular public cities and towns as they grow and attract other settlement, business enterprises, and public transportation and services infrastructure. However, if the primary company experiences hardship or fails outright, or the industry fades in importance –  such as when anthracite mining declined due to dependence on steam locomotives to spur demand – the economic effect on the company town can be devastating. Without a source of employment, the communities lose property value and population as people leave to find work elsewhere.

History

Paternalism

Paternalism, a subtle form of social engineering, refers to the control of workers by their employers who sought to force middle-class ideals upon their working-class employees. Paternalism was considered by many nineteenth-century businessmen as a moral responsibility, or often a religious obligation, which would advance society whilst furthering their own business interests. Accordingly, the company town offered a unique opportunity to achieve such ends.

Although many prominent examples of company towns portray their founders as "capitalists with a conscience", for example, George Cadbury's Bournville, if viewed cynically, the company town was often an economically viable ploy to attract and retain workers. Additionally, for-profit shops within company towns were usually owned by the company, which were unavoidable to its isolated workers, thus resulting in a monopoly for the owners.

Although economically successful, company towns sometimes failed politically due to a lack of elected officials and municipally owned services. Accordingly, workers often had no say in local affairs, and therefore felt dictated to. Ultimately, this political climate caused resentment amongst workers and resulted in many residents eventually losing long-term affection for their towns; such was the case at Pullman.

Pullman lesson

Although many small company towns existed in mining areas of Pennsylvania before the American Civil War, one of the largest, and most substantial early company towns in the United States was Pullman, developed in the 1880s just outside the Chicago city limits. The town, entirely company-owned, provided housing, markets, a library, churches and entertainment for the 6,000 company employees and an equal number of dependents. Employees were not required to live in Pullman, although workers tended to get better treatment if they chose to live in the town.

The town operated successfully until the economic panic of 1893, when demand for the company's products declined, and Pullman lowered employee wages and hours to offset the decrease in demand. Despite this, the company refused to lower rents in the town or the price of goods at its shops, thus resulting in the Pullman Strike of 1894. A national commission formed to investigate the causes of the strikes found that Pullman's paternalism was partly to blame and labelled it "Un-American". The report condemned Pullman for refusing to negotiate and for the economic hardships he created for workers in the town of Pullman. "The aesthetic features are admired by visitors, but have little money value to employees, especially when they lack bread." The State of Illinois filed suit, and in 1898 the Supreme Court of Illinois forced the Pullman Company to divest ownership in the town, which was annexed to Chicago.

However, government observers maintained that Pullman's principles were accurate, in that he provided his employees with a quality of life otherwise unattainable to them, but recognized that his excessive paternalism was inappropriate for a large-scale corporate economy and thus caused the town's downfall. Accordingly, government observers and social reformers alike saw the need for a balance between control and well-designed towns, concluding that a model company town would only succeed if independent professionals, acting as a buffer between employers and employees, took a role in conception, planning, and management of these towns.

Historian Linda Carlson argues that the managers of corporate towns in the early 20th century believed they could avoid the mistakes made by George Pullman in the 1880s. She says they:
wanted to create a better life for their employees: decent housing, good schools, and a "morally uplifting" society.  In return, they expected stable, hard-working employees who would eschew the evils of drink and, most important, not fall prey to the blandishments of union organizers.

Thus, the Pullman Strike did not kill the concept of a company town but rather initiated a new chapter in their existence. Over the next thirty years, the old model of paternalism was abandoned in favour of new professionally designed company towns with architects, landscape architects, and planners translating "new concepts of industrial relations and social welfare into new physical forms". This suited capitalists of the day who were obviously keen to avoid the experiences of Pullman. The first real example of this occurred at Indian Hill-North Village, Massachusetts, in 1915.

Decline of American company towns

By the 1920s, the need for company towns had declined significantly due to increased national affluence. Despite income inequalities and a relatively low standard of living conditions amongst factory laborers, the prosperity of the 1920s saw workers’ material well-being improve significantly. A strong post-war American economy meant installment buying was accessible to low-wage earners who could now purchase previously unattainable goods like automobiles and radios. Moreover, workers were no longer dependent on employers for healthcare and education.

By the 1920s the widespread nature of the automobile meant workers no longer needed to live near their work places and now had access to more employment opportunities. A combination of the freedom that came with private transport and the mass communication of radio saw the isolation of company towns lessen and the social basis of the company town become less necessary.

Furthermore, the accessibility of the working class to private transport also marked a step of equality as they had previously only been accessible to the wealthy. As access to surrounding municipalities increased, residents of company towns gained access to an increasing amount of government-funded public resources such as schools, libraries, and parks. Accordingly, there was no longer a need for the amenities of company towns which, prior to welfare capitalism, had previously been unattainable to the working class.

This new-found freedom saw a change in the mindset of workers who began to look on welfare capitalism as demeaning rather than an incentive. Accordingly, many employees began to request additional pay in lieu of welfare programs. This was well received by some employers as the idea of ‘laissez-faire’ individualism, which promoted entrepreneurial virtues of hard-work being rewarded rather than direct charity, began to shape new-age paternalism.

Modernization and the increase in material well-being had also lessened the perceived need for paternalism and moral reform. Consequently, the economic downturn of the early 1930s saw some businesses do away with employee welfare schemes to reduce costs. However, the Roosevelt Administration's New Deal dealt the final blow to end American company towns by raising minimum wages, encouraging industrial self-governance, and pushing for the owners of company towns to "consider the question of plans for eventual employee ownership of homes". To a lesser extent the New Deal also reduced the need for employee housing by transforming housing finance to a lower-interest, lower-deposit system making home ownership more accessible to the working class.

Model company towns

During the late nineteenth century, model company towns materialised, as enlightened industrialists recognised that many poor workers were living in appalling conditions. These industrialists wished to combat the unsanitary and congested conditions common to working class districts in order to create better living conditions for workers. Model company towns such as Port Sunlight (1888) and Bournville (1895) were influential in regards to their building and planning innovation. The ideas generated from these model towns are regarded as having a significant influence on the Garden City movement.

The model company town is concerned with creating a productive and prosperous company. Enlightened industrialists believed this could be achieved by providing a healthier residential environment for their employees. Planning a model company town involved the fusion of new notions of house design and layout. The paternalism of the enlightened industrialist was exhibited in his desire to provide an environment for his employees that was aesthetically appealing and which included well-designed residences, parks, schools, libraries and meeting halls. The industrialist also wished to contribute to his workers' well-being by providing social programs such as sporting events and functions. This, however, highlights the power and immense control possessed by the company owner, who could shape the lifestyle and activities of his employees to serve his own interests and those of the company.

Model villages for agricultural workers were founded in the early 19th century in the United Kingdom. The creation of model company towns was particularly evident in Britain during the latter half of the nineteenth century with the creation of Saltaire (1851), Bournville, Port Sunlight, Creswell and New Earswick (1901) and coincided with the housing-reform movement, which emphasized the improvement of housing for the working class. These model towns contrasted with the overcrowded conditions in British working-class districts, which were often characterized by congested housing, unsanitary conditions, and poor provision of open space and facilities. Model company towns promoted the idea of orderly, planned town development as well as the notion of planning for the needs of the community in order to provide healthier living conditions.

Model company towns in Britain
Model company towns around the mid-nineteenth century, such as Copley (1849), near Halifax, and Saltaire (1853), close to Bradford, were differentiated by improved dwellings for workers which contrasted with working-class housing in other industrial villages and cities. These model company towns prompted the creation of others, such as Port Sunlight, Bournville and Creswell, within an environment of reform.

Port Sunlight (1888) in Cheshire was established by William Hesketh Lever (later Lord Leverhulme) of Lever Brothers – a soap and tallow manufacturer. The earlier layout of this model company town was planned to suit the undulating topography of the site. Port Sunlight catered for the Lever Brothers employees through the provision of improved housing (cottages of varying designs and materials) and gardens, as well as social and community facilities, including an auditorium, a school, tennis courts and bowling greens. Port Sunlight combined the use of formal and informal planning elements, such as straight streets close to the town centre and curved streets in the residential areas. This combination of the formal and informal represented a new feature of British town planning.

Bournville (1895), near Birmingham, was established by the Cadbury brothers, George and Richard. George and Richard Cadbury chose to transfer the Cadbury factory to this new site in order to provide their employees with improved living conditions and a country environment that they could enjoy – a far cry from the busy, smoky city centre of Birmingham. The firm provided education in the form of a compulsory academic course, and workers were given the opportunity to complete commercial or technical training. The Cadburys also encouraged their workers to get involved in the social life of Bournville through the provision of sports facilities and athletic and cultural clubs, as well as social events such as summer parties. George Cadbury, a Quaker, preached Christian values, such as respectability, thrift and sobriety, and sought to unify the Bournville community through rituals such as gift giving between employer and employee. The firm also established work councils, such as the Women's Works Council, and supported trades unions.

Bournville represented the union of industry and nature as the company town boasted the attractiveness of the countryside and low-density development defined by well-built and visually appealing dwellings. Unlike Port Sunlight, Bournville catered for a mixed community, where residences were not restricted to the workforce only. Bournville illustrated how, towards the end of the nineteenth century, low-density development was being punctuated along with the provision of open air, space and sunlight. Bournville's gardens, parks, tree-lined streets, sense of spaciousness and country setting enhanced its aesthetic appeal and demonstrated George Cadbury's endeavour to provide workers with a healthy, beautiful and well-ventilated environment.

The Bolsover Company developed two exemplary mining communities in Derbyshire during the late nineteenth century, Bolsover (1891) and Creswell (1896). The Bolsover Company aimed to provide improved living conditions for the miners and their families in these model industrial villages. The houses at Creswell were built in concentric circles, and within these circles was a large open parkland and a bandstand. Not only did the Bolsover Company aim to provide better housing, but they also wished to improve workers' moral fibre, believing that the provision of facilities and the promotion of workers' welfare would discourage drunkenness, gambling and bad language. The Bolsover Company provided facilities deemed beneficial for employees at both villages including clubhouses, bowling greens, cooperative society stores, cricket pitches and schools. During the early years of these model industrial villages, the Bolsover Company organized various events intended to enhance community life, such as flower shows, lectures, sporting events, concerts, teas and dances.

Industrial colonies in Catalonia

Catalonia, located in north-eastern Spain, has an especially high density of company towns, known locally as industrial colonies. They are especially concentrated in river basins along the Ter and Llobregat and their tributaries. In Berguedà, for example, within 20 km there are 14 colonies. The total number in Catalonia is around a hundred. These were small towns created around a factory or mine, built in a rural area and, therefore, separate from any other population. They typically housed between 100 and 500 inhabitants; in some cases, upwards of 1000 people lived in these towns.

These industrial colonies were an emblematic aspect of industrialization in Catalonia, specifically the second industrialization, which resulted in certain areas that were once purely rural becoming industrial. They were first created in the second half of the nineteenth century, especially from the 1870s onwards after the American Civil War ended and raw cotton once again became readily available. The last colonies were created in the early years of the twentieth century. Thus, company towns in Catalonia have a history going back some 150 years; however, in almost all cases the company that operated the colony has now shut down. The most common industry in these colonies was textiles and the most important from the standpoint of architecture, urban design the complexity of their operation. There are more than 75 textile colonies recorded; although there were also mining, metallurgy, cement and agricultural colonies.

Mostly these colonies (particularly the textile related ones) were constructed close to a river. This was because they used hydraulic power (waterwheels) to run the factory. One reason for this was that Catalonia was poor in coal and importing it was expensive. In addition, the Catalan rivers (with little volume but a very steep sloping run) provided free and almost inexhaustible energy, that was lacking only in times of drought.

The industrial colonies system began to collapse in the 1960s due to their inflexible capital structure and social changes such as the desire for workers to own appliance, cars, or their own home, the declining influence of religion and the opportunities offered by towns. The colonies gradually emptied of people even before the definitive industrial crisis, which worsened in 1978. In the 1980s and 1990s almost all the factories in these industrial colonies closed. From that moment on, many colonies became towns that were now independent of the company, others were abandoned and remain without inhabitants. Other factories were leased to smaller industries or now lie empty.

Some of the more interesting colonies include: Colònia Güell, in Santa Coloma de Cervelló, which contains several modernist buildings, such as the crypt church built by Antoni Gaudí; L'Ametlla de Merola, Puig-reig, where centenary traditional cultural activities are held, such as the representation of Els Pastorets; the three colonies of Castellbell i el Vilar: La Bauma, El Borràs, El Burés, with buildings of architectural interest; Cal Rosal, between Berga, Avià and Olvan, which, in 1858, was the first colony in the era of building large colonies in the Llobregat; Cal Vidal, Puig-reig, which houses the Museum of the Vidal Colony, or the Museum of the Sedó Colony, ideal visits for anyone wishing to learn what life was like in one of these industrial experiments.

Examples

Belgium

Having bought the mining concession of Grand-Hornu in 1810, French industrialist Henri De Gorge soon realized the need for accommodating the growing workforce of his expanding business. He commissioned architect François Obin and, after his death, Bruno Renard, to build a functional complex in a neoclassical style. Grand-Hornu became one of the world's first purpose-built company towns. It was abandoned in 1954 after the closing of the mine and currently houses a museum of contemporary art as well as temporary exhibitions. Grand-Hornu is one of the four industrial sites in Wallonia that were listed by UNESCO as a World Heritage Site in 2012.

Brazil
Fordlândia was established by American industrialist Henry Ford in 1928 as a prefabricated industrial town in the Amazon rainforest of Brazil. Intended to be inhabited by 10 thousand people, it failed; and the city was abandoned in 1934.

Canada

Arvida, Quebec was developed in 1927 as a company town. The town grew to have a population of about 14,000 inhabitants, four Catholic parishes, and many other denominations, parishes and schools. It was known as "the City Built in 135 Days".

Batawa was set up by the Bata Shoe Company as a planned community around a shoe factory. The factory opened in 1939 and closed in 2000.

Chile
Two of Chile's UNESCO World Heritage Sites correspond to former company towns.

Humberstone was a settlement dedicated to the extraction of saltpeter during said commodity's boom in the late 19th and early 20th centuries. The town was founded and administered by James Thomas Humberstone's Peru Nitrate Company, later acquired by Compañía Salitrera de Tarapacá y Antofagasta (COSATAN), before turning into a ghost town by the 1960s due to the steady decline in the global price of nitrates caused by the development of chemically engineered fertilizers.

Sewell was a mining town intended as both a residential and industrial hub linked to the nearby El Teniente copper mine. Founded in 1906 by the Braden Copper Company, it came to house over 16,000 inhabitants at its peak, despite its remote location in the slopes of the Andes. The difficult geography on which the town was erected led to its distinctive appearance, with steep staircases and the absence of streets for vehicular access. Although the El Teniente mine remains active, the town itself began to be dismantled and abandoned by the late 1960s as the maintenance of a remote on-site town was no longer financially viable. Some industrial activities still take place on the grounds of Sewell, but workers have largely been relocated to nearby urban centres.

Finland

Kuusankoski in Finland, formerly also known as "the paper capital of Finland", is a prime example of the decline many company towns have had to deal with when the company itself struggles. The town relied on three paper mills owned by Kymmene Corporation from the 1870s until 2005 when two mills, Voikkaa and Kuusaa, were shut down, leaving only the Kymi mill operating. An estimated 5% of the local population had been employed by the two closed mills and Kymmene's decision left the town in socioeconomic chaos. Kuusankoski's independent status ended in 2009 when the town was consolidated into the regional capital, Kouvola.

France

The French city of Le Creusot is a company town.

Germany

Leverkusen was founded in 1861 around Carl Leverkus' dye factory that later became the headquarters of Bayer. The city of Ludwigshafen has been dominated by BASF's plants since the chemical company moved here in 1865. The neighbouring municipality Limburgerhof emerged from housing estates for BASF workers as well. Neuölsburg, built since 1875 for the workers of Ilseder Hütte, was a separate municipality until 1964. Many other companies, especially in the mining and steel industry built housing estates for their workers near existing cities, rather than separate company towns. A notable example is Siedlung Eisenheim in Oberhausen from the mid-19th century, once home to 1200 steel smelters of the Gutehoffnungshütte, which is now protected as a historic monument. The mining settlements built around the coal pits of the Ruhr region were called Zechenkolonien ("pit colonies").

Wolfsburg was created as a planned city in 1938 to host the Volkswagen plant and its workers. A similar Nazi-era planned town is Salzgitter, built around the Reichswerke Hermann Göring that later became the Salzgitter AG. In 1950s East Germany, Eisenhüttenstadt ("ironworks city", initially Stalinstadt) was built from scratch, housing the workers of the Eisenhüttenkombinat Ost ironworks.

Japan

In Japan, an equivalent to company towns are "Kigyō Jōkamachi" (Company castle town). However, these differ from company towns in that the companies do not own nor have developed these towns themselves. Instead, the term refers to towns where a specific company has a major influence on the town's economy as a result of that company or its subcontractors employing a significant part of the town's population. An example is Toyota, Aichi, where the "castle" company is the automobile manufacturer Toyota. In some cases, such towns can be named after the company. For example, the Toyota City changed its name from Koromo City and named the area of the town where Toyota's headquarters is situated "" (note that katakana is used here to reflect the company name) in 1959.

Namibia

The border town Oranjemund, Namibia is a company town owned by Namibian DeBeers (Namdeb). The town has a diamond mine that was established over 25 years ago and is still ongoing until this day. Residents of Oranjemund either work in the mine or for the company in offices based in the town. To enter the town, all people above 18 need permission to pass its gates and need to provide a residential, and reason for visiting. Due to this the town has no homeless people at all and can regulate people coming in and out of the town. A municipality has recently been introduced in Oranjemund and will start to fully operate in late 2016 meaning residents will soon start paying for Water and Electricity which has been a benefit to them. The town is staged and is busy readying itself to becoming open to the public.

Poland

Widzew, a suburb of Łódź in Poland, had been a textile company town before the Second World War.

Slovakia

Svit in Slovakia was founded in 1934 by business industrialist Jan Antonín Baťa in accordance with his policy of establishing well-organized model communities for his workers and other employees. This town (like other Baťa's company towns) was also an example of social engineering.

Sweden

The mining city of Kiruna in Sweden was originally, around 1900, built by the mining company in an unpopulated area. Many buildings, including the church, were built by the company. There are also many smaller towns that were built and even planned by companies. Skoghall in Värmland is such an example where Stora AB owned a papermill and contained a city-planning office.

Ukraine
The city of Pripyat in Ukraine was established in 1970 solely to house the workers at the adjacent Chernobyl Nuclear Power Plant and their families. It was one of several "nuclear cities" constructed by Soviet nuclear power firms throughout the latter half of the 20th century. All amenities, stores, and employment was conducted through each nuclear city's power plant administration.

United States

At their peak there were more than 2,500 company towns, housing 3% of the US population. The companies that ran the towns were primarily labor companies such as coal, steel, lumber and various war industries. Most of the people living in these towns were immigrants new to the country. The tight, paternalistic control exerted by companies over the residents' behaviour and even opinions caused issues and concern.

Segundo, Colorado, was a company town where the CF&I coal company housed its workers. It offered adequate housing and promoted upward mobility through its sponsorship of a YMCA Center, an elementary school, and some small businesses, as well as a company store.  However, air pollution was a constant health threat, and the houses lacked indoor plumbing. As demand for metallurgical coal declined, the mine laid off workers, and Segundo's population declined.  After a major fire in 1929, CF&I left town, and Segundo became practically a ghost town.

One famous company town was McDonald, Ohio, which was created by the Carnegie Steel Company to house and serve the needs of its employees in the Youngstown, Ohio, area.

Marktown, Clayton Mark's planned worker community, was an example in northwest Indiana.

In the present-day United States, it is relatively rare for any place in which a single company owns all the property to be granted status as an incorporated municipality. Rather, companies will normally prefer their wholly owned communities to remain unincorporated, as this permits administration of the community to be carried out by appointed company officers rather than elected officials. However, there are incorporated municipalities that are heavily dependent upon a single industry or organization and may be loosely considered a "company town", even though the company does not technically own the town.

Scotia, California is a company town, previously owned by The Pacific Lumber Company, and is being dismantled through PLC's bankruptcy process.

Cass, West Virginia, is a former company town that is now a state park. Originally founded in 1901, the town of Cass served employees who cut and processed lumber from the surrounding mountain slopes. Some of the remaining houses are available for rental; other features are the company store and an operating railway.

Bay Lake, Florida and Lake Buena Vista, Florida are controlled by The Walt Disney Company.

In 2021, the governor of Nevada, Steve Sisolak, announced a plan to launch so-called "Innovation Zones" in Nevada to attract technology firms. The zones would permit companies with large areas of land to form governments carrying the same authority as counties, including the ability to impose taxes, form school districts and courts and provide government services. The measure to further economic development with the "alternative form of local government" has not yet been introduced in the Legislature. Sisolak pitched the concept in his State of the State address on January 19. By allowing tech corporations to establish their own governments, the plan is hoped to bring in new businesses at the forefront of “groundbreaking technologies” without the state cutting taxes or paying economic rent that previously helped Nevada attract companies like Tesla Inc.

In March 2021, Elon Musk announced plans to incorporate the Boca Chica area of far southeastern Texas, the site of a SpaceX rocket manufacturing and launch facility, as the city of "Starbase". Some have labeled the plans, and SpaceX's existing operations in the area, as an example of a company town.

See also

List of company towns
College town
Company store
Corporatocracy
Ghost town
History of coal miners
Housing cooperative
Megacorporation
Mill town
Monotown, a similar phenomenon in Russia
Public housing
Railway town
Welfare capitalism, also known as industrial paternalism
Wage slavery
Zone for Employment and Economic Development (Honduras)

References

Bibliography

United Kingdom

Jackson, F. (1985). Sir Raymond Unwin: Architect, planner and visionary. London: A. Zwemmer Ltd.

United States

Garner, J.S. (1992). The Company Town: Architecture and Society in the Early Industrial Age. Oxford. Oxford University Press
Garner, J.S., ed. (1982).  The Model Company Town: Urban Design through Private Enterprise in Nineteenth-century New England (1984)
Green, Hardy (2012). The Company Town: The Industrial Edens and Satanic Mills That Shaped the American Economy. Basic Books.         ( excerpt and text search)

Cities by type
 
Labor history
Types of towns
Company housing